Changpeng Zhao, commonly known as CZ, is a Chinese-born Canadian businessman, investor, and software engineer. Zhao is the co-founder and CEO of Binance, the world's largest cryptocurrency exchange by trading volume as of July 2022. 

According to Bloomberg Billionaires Index, Zhao was ranked the 136th-richest person in the world, with a net worth estimated at $13.1 billion as of December 2022.

Early life and education
Zhao was born in China's Jiangsu province. In the late 1980s, when he was 12 years old, he immigrated with his family to Canada, settling down in Vancouver, British Columbia. His parents were both schoolteachers in China. His father worked as a university instructor before he was branded a "pro-bourgeois intellect" and exiled to rural areas shortly after Zhao's birth. During his teenage years, Zhao helped to support his family by holding down a number of menial  service jobs, including working as a fast-food clerk at a McDonald's restaurant.

Zhao attended McGill University in Montreal, Quebec, where he majored in computer science.

Early career 
After graduating from McGill, Zhao was selected for an internship in Tokyo working for a subcontractor of the Tokyo Stock Exchange, developing software for matching trade orders. He then worked full-time for four years at Bloomberg Tradebook where he was a developer of futures trading software.

Business career
In 2005, Zhao moved to Shanghai to establish his technology startup company, Fusion Systems, which was known for "some of the fastest automated high-frequency trading platforms and systems for stockbrokers."

In 2013, Zhao was a member of the team that developed Blockchain.info and whom he had also served as Chief Technology Officer of OKCoin.

Binance
After its launch in July 2017, the Binance cryptocurrency exchange was able to raise $15 million in an initial coin offering, and trading began on the exchange eleven days later. In less than eight months, Zhao grew Binance into the world's largest cryptocurrency exchange by trading volume (as of April 2018). Zhao also launched Binance Coin in 2017; this is a utility token that gives its owners various benefits, such as discounts on trading fees. In April 2019, Binance launched Binance Smart Chain, which has smart contract functionality and is an Ethereum competitor.

In February 2018, Forbes placed him third on their list of "The Richest People In Cryptocurrency," with an estimated net worth of $1.1-2 billion.

In 2019, Zhao launched Binance's U.S. affiliate, Binance.US. Binance withdrew its application to run a Singapore-based crypto exchange in 2021.

Views on Crypto 
In an interview with The New York Times, Zhao said people are getting into crypto as they see it grow, "trade it and make money off it as opposed to using it", but that the market will always self-correct. On April 6, 2021, Zhao told Bloomberg Markets that nearly 100% of his liquid net worth was in the form of cryptocurrency.

In 2022, Zhao invested $500 million through Binance to finance the acquisition of Twitter by Elon Musk.

Personal life 
Zhao has said that he is "a Canadian citizen, period." Born in China in 1977, Zhao acquired a Canadian visa in 1989 and left China that same year after the harrowing events of the Tiananmen Square. In 2022, Zhao said that he acquired Canadian citizenship 30 years beforehand, around in 1992. In 2005 he moved back to China, eventually owning an apartment in Shanghai. In 2015, he sold his Shanghai apartment and used the funds to purchase Bitcoin. Zhao stayed in China until after the Chinese government banned crypto exchanges in late 2017. He is currently based in Singapore.

Zhao has said he plans to donate up to 99% of his wealth, following the philanthropic feats of other global business magnates and investors. "I intend to donate most of my wealth, as many other entrepreneurs or founders have done, from Peabody to today. I intend to donate 90%, 95%, or 99% of my wealth."

According to a Reuters investigative story about Binance, Zhao had a romantic relationship with former Chinese travel television show host and Binance co-founder Yi He for "several years." She later gave birth to a son in the United States.

References 

1977 births
Living people
21st-century Canadian businesspeople
Billionaires from Jiangsu
Businesspeople from Jiangsu
Businesspeople from Vancouver
Canadian billionaires
Canadian chairpersons of corporations
Canadian computer businesspeople
Canadian financial company founders
Canadian financiers
Canadian investors
Canadian software engineers
Canadian technology chief executives
Canadian technology company founders
Chinese emigrants to Canada
Engineers from Jiangsu
McGill University Faculty of Science alumni
People associated with cryptocurrency